Kingscott is a surname. Notable people with the name include:
Arthur Kingscott (1864–1937), English soccer referee and administrator
Harry Kingscott (2 March 1890 – 17 November 1956), English soccer referee